Hellé Nice (born Mariette Hélène Delangle; 15 December 1900 – 1 October 1984) was a French model, dancer, and a motor racing driver who competed in numerous minor Grands Prix and other races between 1928 and 1939, whose racing career was impaired by a serious crash in 1936, and whose effort to resume racing after World War II was ruined by an unproven accusation of collaboration with the Nazis.

Early life
Mariette Hélène Delangle was the daughter of Alexandrine Bouillie and Léon Delangle, the postman in Aunay-sous-Auneau, Eure-et-Loir, a village 47 miles from Paris. She went to Paris at age 16, initially working as a nude model for artist Rene Carrere, who encouraged her to take up ballet, leading to her becoming a very successful dancer under the stage name Hélène Nice which eventually became Hellé Nice. She built a solid reputation as a solo act but in 1926 decided to partner with Robert Lisset and performed at cabarets around Europe. Her income from dancing as well as modelling became such that she could afford to purchase a home and her own yacht.  However, her dancing career was cut short in 1929 after she had an accident whilst evading an avalanche while skiing, saving her life but injuring her knee badly.

In addition to the fast cars of her racing career, Nice lived a fast life. Her growing fame meant there was no shortage of suitors. Some of her affairs were brief while others were of longer duration that, beyond the wealthy and powerful Philippe de Rothschild, included members of the European nobility and other personalities such as Henri de Courcelles, Jean Bugatti and Count Bruno d'Harcourt.

Racing career
Nice was introduced to motor racing by racing driver de Courcelles. At the time, the Paris area was one of the principal centres of the French car industry and there were numerous competitions for auto enthusiasts. Nice loved the thrill of driving fast cars and so snatched the chance to perform in the racing event at the annual fair organized by fellow performers from the Paris entertainment world. She was an avid downhill skier but an accident on the slopes damaged her knee and ended her dancing career.

Hellé Nice decided to try her hand at professional auto racing. In June 1929, driving an Oméga-Six, she won a short (50 km) 5-car race (entitled the "Grand Prix féminin") and finished 15th in the main (150 km) Women's Championship race (both races run on a handicap basis) at the all-female Journée Féminine at Autodrome de Montlhéry. In December of the same year and at the same venue she recorded a speed of 196.871 km/h over 5 km (with a best lap at 197.7 km/h (123.56 mph)) in a 2-litre supercharged Bugatti, which has been supposed by some to have been (unofficially) a world record speed for women; however, Mme Janine Jennky had achieved a speed of 199.059 km/h over the flying kilometre in a 2-litre Bugatti at the Arpajon Speed Trials almost a year-and-a-half earlier, on 26 August 1928. Nevertheless, capitalising on her fame, in 1930 Hellé Nice toured the United States, racing at a variety of tracks in an American-made Miller racing car.

Philippe de Rothschild introduced himself to her shortly after her return from America. For a time, the two shared a bed and the love of automobile racing. Rothschild had been racing his Bugatti and he introduced her to Ettore Bugatti. The owner of the very successful car company thought Nice would be an ideal person to add to the male drivers of his line of racing vehicles. She achieved her goal and in 1931 and drove a Bugatti Type 35C in a number of minor Grands Prix in France and in the non-championship Monza Grand Prix.

Hellé Nice was easily recognizable in her bright-blue race car. She wowed the crowds whenever she raced while adding to her income with a string of product endorsements, including advertising for Esso and Lucky Strike, which saw her featured on thousands of posters, helping her to become one of the most famous people in France. She also earned significant amounts from racing, receiving entry fees worth the equivalent of $100,000 per race when inflation-adjusted to the 2018 value of the dollar. Although she never competed in a major Grande Epreuve and never won a Grand Prix race, she was a regular participant, and occasionally finished ahead of some of her male rivals. Over the next several years, as one of the small number of female drivers appearing on the Grand Prix circuit, Nice continued to race Bugattis and Alfa Romeos against the greatest drivers of the day. She competed not only in minor Grand Prix races but also hillclimbs and rallies all over Europe, winning the 1932 Rallye Paris – Saint-Raphaël Féminin, and also appearing in the famous Monte Carlo Rally.

On 10 September 1933, she was a competitor at one of the most tragic races in history. During the 1933 Monza Grand Prix - a formula libre event held on the same day as the Italian Grand Prix, but on different circuit layout - at the Autodromo Nazionale Monza, Giuseppe Campari, Baconin "Mario Umberto" Borzacchini, and the Polish count Stanislas Czaikowski, three of the leading race drivers of the day, were killed. Nice finished third (and last of the finishers) in the race's second heat, in which Campari and Borzacchini had been killed and was flagged off in 9th place, two laps behind the winner, in the shortened final in which Czaikowski had died.

Crash
In 1936, she travelled to Brazil to compete in two Grand Prix races. During the São Paulo Grand Prix, she was in third place behind Brazilian champion Manuel de Teffé when a freak accident resulted in her nearly being killed. Her Alfa Romeo somersaulted through the air and crashed into the grandstand, killing six people and injuring more than thirty others. Nice was thrown from the car and landed on a soldier who absorbed the full impact of her body, saving her life. The force of the impact killed the soldier and because she lay unconscious, she too was thought to be dead. Taken to hospital, she awoke from a coma three days later and two months later was discharged from the hospital. The tragedy turned her into a national hero among the Brazilian population.

In 1937, she attempted a racing comeback, hoping to compete in the Mille Miglia and at the Tripoli Grand Prix, which offered a very substantial cash prize. However, she was unable to get the necessary backing and instead participated in the "Yacco" endurance trials for female drivers at the Montlhéry racetrack in France. There, alternating with three other women, Nice drove for ten days and ten nights, the team breaking ten world records over distances and periods from 20,000 km to 10 days.

World War II
For the next two years, she competed in rallying while hoping to rejoin the Bugatti team. However, in August 1939, her friend Jean Bugatti was killed while testing a company vehicle and a month later, racing in Europe came to a halt with the onset of World War II. In 1943, during the German occupation of France, she moved to the French Riviera and acquired a home in Nice, where she lived for the remainder of the war.

Accusations of collaboration 
In 1949 fellow driver Louis Chiron accused her at a party in Monaco to celebrate the first postwar Monte Carlo Rally of "collaborating with the Nazis". However, her biographer Miranda Seymour is "circumspect on Nice's guilt", setting out various ways in which (hypothetically) she might have been considered to have collaborated, but noting that her enquiries at the Bundesarchiv in Berlin yielded no record of Nice having been a "Gestapo agent", as Chiron had appeared to claim. Despite the absence of definitive evidence, the accusation nevertheless left her "unemployable", being enough to deter sponsors and effectively ending her career.

Final years and death 
One of the 20th century's most colourful women, who had competed with some success in more than 70 events at the higher echelons of automobile racing (including around 32 minor grands prix), spent her final years in a sordid rat-infested apartment in the back alleys of the city of Nice, living under a fictitious name to hide her shame. Neighbours recalled Nice "taking the milk out of the cats' saucers because she had nothing to eat or drink". Estranged from her family for years, she died penniless, friendless, and completely forgotten by the rich and glamorous crowd involved in Grand Prix motor racing. Her cremation was paid for by the Parisian charity organisation that had helped her, and the ashes were sent back to her sister in the village of Sainte-Mesme near her birthplace and where her parents were buried. She is not mentioned on the family's cemetery memorial. In 2008 a memorial plaque was erected on her previously unmarked grave by a foundation established in her name.

References

Further reading
 Emanuelle Dechelette, La femme la plus rapide du monde. Automobile historique. November/December 2001 - n° 51, pp. 52–56.
 Seymour, Miranda The Bugatti Queen: In Search of a French Racing Legend. (2004) Random House, New York;

External links

 

French female dancers
French female models
French racing drivers
French female racing drivers
Grand Prix drivers
Bugatti people
1900 births
1984 deaths
Sportspeople from Eure-et-Loir
20th-century French women